Aaditya Uddhav Thackeray (born 13 June 1990) is an Indian Politician who served as a Cabinet Minister of Higher Education, Cabinet Minister of Tourism and Environment for the Government of Maharashtra. He is also an MLA of Maharashtra Legislative Assembly from Mumbai, Maharashtra. He is the son of Uddhav Thackeray, an Indian politician who served as the 19th Chief Minister of Maharashtra, leader of the Shiv Sena (UBT), and grandson of Balasaheb Thackeray. He is the President of Yuva Sena, a youth wing of Shiv Sena. He was a Maharashtra Cabinet minister and was inducted as a cabinet minister in the state cabinet on 30 December 2019.

Early life
Aaditya was born to Uddhav Thackeray and Rashmi. He has a younger brother, Tejas. He completed his schooling from Bombay Scottish School in Mahim, South Mumbai. Thackeray later obtained a BA History degree while studying at St. Xavier's College in Fort, South Mumbai. He obtained his law degree from Kishinchand Chellaram Law College in Churchgate, South Mumbai, where he earned his LLB degree.

Work
His first book of poems, 'My Thoughts in White and Black', was published in 2007. The following year, he turned lyricist and released a private album Ummeed, for which he wrote all the eight songs.

He was involved in or initiated a book burning agitation against inclusion of Rohinton Mistry's book 'Such a Long Journey', which was insulting Marathis, in Mumbai University's reading list in 2010. Thackeray alleged that the book included insulting language against Marathis.

Political career

In October 2019, Thackeray contested the 2019 Maharashtra Legislative Assembly election from the Worli constituencyin Mumbai and subsequently emerged victorious. In doing so, he became the first member of the Thackeray family to contest and win elections. He became the Cabinet Minister for tourism, protocol and environment on 30 December 2019 in the Uddhav Thackeray-led Maha Vikas Aghadi government.

Prior to getting officially elected, Thackeray played a significant role in several projects during the Devendra Fadnavis-led government, prominently being a ban of single-use plastics in Maharashtra, which was well received by residents of the state.

Positions held
 2010: Appointed President of Yuva Sena.
 2017: Elected as President of Mumbai District Football Association.
 2018: Appointed Leader of ShivSena Party.
 2019: MLA from Worli constituency.
 2019: Cabinet Minister of Environment, Tourism and Protocol, Government of Maharashtra.
 2020: Appointed guardian minister of Mumbai Suburban district.

See also 

 Political families of Maharashtra 
 Political families of India

References

External links
 

Shiv Sena politicians
Living people
1990 births
Marathi politicians
Maharashtra politicians
Politicians from Mumbai
Marathi-language writers
Bal Thackeray
Maharashtra MLAs 2019–2024
St. Xavier's College, Mumbai alumni
Thackeray family
Indian football executives